The article contains information about the 2017–18 Iran 3rd Division football season. This is the 4th rated football league in Iran after the Persian Gulf Cup, Azadegan League, and 2nd Division. The league started from October 2017.

In total and in the first round, 61 teams will compete in 5 different groups.

First round
Each team who give up in 2 matches, will be relegated 2 divisions for next season. Therefore, in this stage, the teams which gave up 2 matches, will be eligible to play in the provincial 2nd division for 2018–19 season (and not eligible to play in the provincial 1st division)

Group A

Group B

Group C

Group D

Group E

Second round

Second Round will be started after first round (December 2017)

Promotion and Relegation:

First team of each group (total: 3 teams) will promote to second division.

Teams ranked 2 in each group and the best 3rd place team, will promote to playoff round.

In playoff round, two teams of four, will play against each other and winners will play another match. The winner of last match will promote to second division.
(Totally 4 teams will promote)

Playoff losers (3 teams), other 3rd ranked teams who did not qualify to playoff round (2 teams), and teams ranked 4th and 5th (total: 11 teams) will play in second round of next season.

Teams ranked 7th or below (15 teams) will play in first round of next season.

Each team who give up in 2 matches, will be relegated 2 divisions for next season. Therefore, in this stage, the teams which gave up 2 matches, will be eligible to play in the provincial 1st division for 2018–19 season (and not eligible to play in the 1st stage of 3rd division)

Group A (North)

Group B (Center & East )

Group C (South)

Ranking of 3rd Placed Teams

Play-off

First round

Second round

The winner will be promoted to 2018–19 Iran Football's 2nd Division.

References 

League 3 (Iran) seasons
4